Norwest United AFC was a semi-professional association football club in Auckland, New Zealand. They merged with Waitakere City in 2021 to form West Coast Rangers

References
 UltimateNZSoccer website's Norwest United  page

External links
 Norwest United Official website
 NFF CLUB DIRECTORY

Association football clubs in Auckland
1984 establishments in New Zealand